Thomas Aubrey may refer to:

Thomas Aubrey (Methodist minister) (1808–1867), Welsh Wesleyan Methodist minister
Sir Thomas Aubrey, 5th Baronet (died 1786) of the Aubrey baronets
Sir Thomas Digby Aubrey, 7th Baronet (1782–1856) of the Aubrey baronets, High Sheriff of Buckinghamshire

See also